Paulina Rubio is a Mexican singer and songwriter. She began her career in 1982 with the band Timbiriche and has been the most popular Latin acts in the world to the early-1990s. Rubio began her solo career with the EMI Music label in 1992 and in 2000 she continued with Universal Music. To date she has recorded 11 studio albums and is considered one of the most influential female artists.

ALMA Awards
The American Latino Media Arts Award, or ALMA Awards is a distinction awarded to Latino performers who promote positive portrayals of Latinos in the entertainment field. Paulina Rubio received one nomination in 2002.

|-
| rowspan="2" align="center"|2002
| rowspan="2" |Paulina Rubio
| Breakthrough artist/group
|
|-
| Outstanding Spanish language performance in a TV special
|
|-

American Music Awards
The American Music Awards is an annual awards ceremony created by Dick Clark in 1973. Paulina Rubio received one nomination in 2004.

|-
| align="center"|2004
| Paulina Rubio
| Favorite Latin Artist
|
|-

BMI Awards
Broadcast Music, Inc. (BMI) is one of three United States performing rights organizations, along with ASCAP and SESAC. It collects license fees on behalf of songwriters, composers, and music publishers and distributes them as royalties to those members whose works have been performed. Paulina Rubio has been received 8 awards from 8 nominations.

BMI London Awards

|-
| align="center"|2003
| "Yo No Soy Esa Mujer"
|  rowspan="2"|Latin Award
|
|-
| align="center"|2009
| "Nena"
|
|-

BMI Latin Awards

|-
| rowspan="2" align="center"|2002
| "El Último Adiós"
|  rowspan="6"|Winning Songs
|
|-
| rowspan="1" |"Y Yo Sigo Aquí"
|
|-
| align="center"|2003
| "Yo No Soy Esa Mujer"
|
|-
| align="center"|2004
| "Todo Mi Amor"
|
|-
| align="center"|2005
| "Dame Otro Tequila"
|
|-
| align="center"|2013
| "Me Gustas Tanto"
|
|-

E! Entertainment Awards

|-
|2000
| Paulina Rubio
| Breakthrough artist
|

Festival Acapulco

|-
| rowspan="1" align="center"|1993
| rowspan="5" align="center"| Paulina Rubio
| Medalla de Plata
|
|-
| rowspan="1" align="center"|1994
| Medalla de Oro
|
|-
| rowspan="1" align="center"|1995
| rowspan="2" align="center"| Medalla Especial
|
|-
| rowspan="1" align="center"|1997
|
|-
| rowspan="1" align="center"|2001
| Medalla de Plata
|

Grammy Awards
The Grammy Awards are awarded annually by the National Academy of Recording Arts and Sciences in the United States. Paulina Rubio has received two nominations.

|-
| align="center"|2005
| Pau-Latina
|rowspan="2"|Best Latin Pop Album
|
|-
| align="center"|2010
| Gran City Pop
|
|-

GQ Men of the Year Awards 
GQ Men of the Year featuring the award recipients in a special issue of the magazine. Paulina Rubio has received two special awards in the Spanish and Mexican editions.

GQ Magazine Spain 

|-
|rowspan="2" align="center"|2003
| "Herself"
| Woman of the Year
|

GQ Magazine Mexico 

|-
|rowspan="2" align="center"|2009
| "Herself"
| Woman of the Year
|

International Dance Music Awards
The International Dance Music Awards were established in 1985. It is a part of the Winter Music Conference, a weeklong electronic music event held annually. Paulina Rubio has received two awards from one nomination.

|-
| align="center"|2003
| Paulina Rubio
| Best New Dance Artist Solo
|
|-

Lo Nuestro Awards 
The Lo Nuestro Awards is a Spanish-language awards show honoring the best of Latin music, presented by Univision, a Spanish-language television network based in the United States. The awards began in 1989. Paulina Rubio won 6 awards.

|-
| rowspan="2" align="center"|1993
| rowspan="2"|Paulina Rubio
|rowspan="1"| Female Artist of the Year, Pop
|
|-
|rowspan="1"|New Pop Artist of the Year
|
|-
| rowspan="2" align="center"|2001
| rowspan="1"|Paulina Rubio
|rowspan="1"| Pop Female Artist 
|
|-
| rowspan="1"|Paulina
|rowspan="1"| Pop Album
|
|-
| rowspan="3" align="center"|2002
| rowspan="1"|Paulina Rubio
|rowspan="1"| Pop Female Artist
|
|-
| rowspan="2"|"Y Yo Sigo Aquí"
|rowspan="1"| Pop Song
|
|-
|rowspan="1"| Video of the Year
|
|-
| rowspan="1" align="center"|2003
| rowspan="1"|Si Tú Te Vas
|rowspan="1"| Video of the Year
|
|-
| rowspan="5" align="center"|2005
| rowspan="2"|Paulina Rubio
|rowspan="1"| Legendary Young Artist Award
|
|-
|rowspan="1"| Pop Female Artist
|
|-
| rowspan="1"|Pau-Latina
|rowspan="1"| Pop Album
|
|-
| rowspan="2"|"Te Quise Tanto"
|rowspan="1"| Song of the Year
|
|-
|rowspan="1"| Video of the Year
|
|-
| rowspan="1" align="center"|2006
| rowspan="2"|Paulina Rubio
|rowspan="2"| Pop Female Artist
|
|-
| rowspan="1" align="center"|2008
|
|-
| rowspan="3" align="center"|2010
| rowspan="1"|Gran City Pop
|rowspan="1"| Pop Album
|
|-
| rowspan="1"|Paulina Rubio
|rowspan="1"| Pop Female Artist
|
|-
| rowspan="1"|"Causa y Efecto"
|rowspan="1"| Song of the Year
|
|-
| rowspan="1" align="center"|2011
| rowspan="3"|Paulina Rubio
|rowspan="3"| Pop Female Artist
|
|-
| rowspan="1" align="center"|2012
|
|-
| rowspan="3" align="center"|2013
|
|-
| rowspan="1"|Brava!
|rowspan="1"| Pop Album
|
|-
| rowspan="1"|"Me Gustas Tanto"
|rowspan="1"| Pop Song
|
|-
| rowspan="1" align="center"|2014
| rowspan="1"|Paulina Rubio
|rowspan="1"| Pop Female Artist
|
|-
| rowspan="1" align="center"|2019
| rowspan="1"|"El Último Adiós"
|rowspan="1"| Replay Song of the Year
|
|-
| rowspan="1" align="center"|2021
| rowspan="1"|"Tú y Yo"
|rowspan="1"| Cumbia Song of the Year - Regional Mexican
|
|-

Los Premios MTV Latinoamérica
Premios MTV Latinoamérica or VMALA's is the Latin American version of the Video Music Awards. Paulina Rubio has received three awards from thirteen nominations.

|-
| rowspan="4" align="center"|2002
| rowspan="1"|"Si Tú Te Vas"
| Video of the Year
|
|-
| rowspan="10"|Paulina Rubio
| Best Female Artist
|
|-
| Best Pop Artist
|
|-
| Best Artist — North
|
|-
| rowspan="1" align="center"|2003
| Best Pop Artist
|
|-
| rowspan="1" align="center"|2004
| Best Pop Artist
|
|-
| rowspan="1" align="center"|2007
| Fashionista Award — Female
|
|-
| rowspan="6" align="center"|2009
| Artist of the Year
|
|-
| Best Solo Artist
|
|-
| Best Pop Artist
|
|-
| Best Artist — North
|
|-
| rowspan="1"|"Causa y Efecto"
| Video of the Year
|
|-
| rowspan="1"|Performance with Cobra Starship
| Best Live Performance at "Los Premios 2009"
|
|-

Latin Billboard Music Awards 
The Billboard Latin Music Awards grew out of the Billboard Music Awards program from Billboard Magazine, an industry publication charting the sales and radio airplay success of musical recordings. Paulina Rubio has received 6 awards from 12 nominations.

|-
| rowspan="1" align="center"|2001
| Paulina
| Pop Album of the Year, Female
|
|-
| rowspan="2" align="center"|2003
| "Todo Mi Amor"
| Latin Pop Airplay Track of the Year, Female
|
|-
| "Don't Say Goodbye/Si Tú Te Vas" Remixes
| Latin Dance Club Play Track of the Year 
|
|-
| rowspan="3" align="center"|2005
| Paulina Rubio
| Hot Latin Tracks Artist Of The Year
|
|-
| Pau-Latina
| Pop Album of the Year, Female
|
|-
| "Te Quise Tanto"
| Latin Pop Airplay Track Of The Year, Female
|
|-
| rowspan="2" align="center"|2007
| Ananda
| Latin Pop Album of the Year, Female
|
|-
| "Ni Una Sola Palabra"
| Latin Pop Airplay Track Of The Year, Female
|
|-
| rowspan="4" align="center"|2010
| rowspan="3" align="center"| Paulina Rubio
| Hot Latin Songs - Female Artist of the Year
|
|-
| Top Latin Albums Artist of the Year, Female
|
|-
| Latin Pop Airplay Artist of the Year, Female
|
|-
| rowspan="1" align="center"| "Causa y Efecto"
| Latin Pop Airplay Song of the Year:
|
|-

Latin Grammy Awards
The Latin Grammy Awards are awarded annually in the United States since 2000 for outstanding contributions to Spanish language music. Paulina Rubio has received six nominations.

Premios Juventud
Premios Juventud is an awards show for Spanish-speaking celebrities in the areas of film, music, sports, fashion, and pop culture, presented by the television network Univision. Paulina Rubio has received one award from eleven nominations.

|-
| 2004
| Paulina Rubio
| All Over The Dial	
|
|-

Premios Micrófono de Oro
El Micrófono de Oro is an award that until 2012 was awarded annually by the Federation of Radio and Television Associations, to reward outstanding careers within the world of journalism: bullfighting, fashion, theater, cinema, sports, dance and politics. Paulina Rubio received an award.

|-
| 2007
| Paulina Rubio
| Singer of the Year
|
|-

Premios Soberano
Premios Soberano (previously known as the Casandra Awards), is the highest distinction awarded in the Dominican Republic, an award that recognizes the trajectory of the figures of art and entertainment in the country and Latin America. Paulina Rubio has received two awards.

|-
| align="center"|2006
| rowspan="2" | Paulina Rubio
| rowspan="2" | Sovereign International
| 
|-
| align="center"|2007
| 
|-
|}

Premios Tu Mundo
Premios Tu Mundo is an awards show honoring the best of Latin music, presented by Telemundo. Paulina Rubio has been nominated one time.

|-
| rowspan="1" align="center"|2012
| rowspan="1" |"Boys Will Be Boys"
| Best Music Video
|

Premios Tu Música
Paulina Rubio has received two awards.

|-
| rowspan="2" align="center"|2004
| rowspan="2" align="center"| Paulina Rubio
| Best International Artist
|
|-
| People Award
|

Premios Ondas

|-
| align="center"|2001
| Paulina Rubio
| Best Latin Newcomer Artist or Group
| 
|}

Premios Paoli

|-
| align="center"|2010
| Paulina Rubio
| International Artist 
| 
|}

Premios Oye!
Premios Oye! are presented annually by the Academia Nacional de la Música en México for outstanding achievements in Mexican record industry. Paulina Rubio has received two special awards.

|-
| 2002
| Paulina Rubio
| Mexican artist with the greatest international projection
|
|-
| rowspan="2"|2004
| rowspan="2"|Pau-Latina
| Album of the Year
|
|-
| Female Pop Album of the Year
|
|-
| rowspan="2" align="center"|2009
| Paulina Rubio
| Favorite artist of the public
|
|-
| Causa Y Efecto
| Video of the Year
|

Ritmo Latino Music Awards
Ritmo Latino Music Awards was associated for four years bearing the name "El Premio De La Gente" and all the winners are determined in a direct vote by fans. Paulina Rubio has received six awards.

|-
| rowspan="3" align="center"|2001
| "Paulina"
| Album of the Year
|
|-
| Paulina Rubio
| Best Female Artist of the Year
|
|-
| "Y Yo Sigo Aquí"
| Best Music Video
|
|-
| rowspan="3" align="center"|2004
| Paulina Rubio / "Pau-Latina"
| Female Pop Artist or Group of the Year
|
|-
| Paulina Rubio
| Artist of the Year - Male or Female
|
|-
| "Te Quise Tanto"
| Song of the Year - Male or Female
|

Telehit Awards
The Telehit Awards are the most influential music awards and artists on television held in Mexico. Paulina Rubio has received two awards.

|-
| rowspan="1" align="center"|2009
| rowspan="2"|Paulina Rubio
| rowspan="1"|Mexican International Artist 
|
|-
| rowspan="1" align="center"|2012
| rowspan="1"|Special Award 20 Years of Trayectory
|
|}

Premios TVyNovelas México
The Premios TVyNovelas are presented annually by Televisa and the magazine TVyNovelas to honor the best Mexican television productions, including telenovelas.

|-
|1993
| rowspan="2"|Paulina Rubio
|Female Singer Revelation of the Year	
|
|-
|2002
|Singer of the Year
|
|}

Premios TERRA

Orquidea International Festival Awards
The International Orquidea Festival was an international musical contest held annually in an interrupted manner in Venezuela. Paulina Rubio received the category "Diamante" in 2002.

|-
|2002
|Paulina Rubio
|Orquídea Diamante
|
|-

Viña del Mar International Song Festival Awards
Viña del Mar International Song Festival is considered the most important and prestigious music festival in Latin America. Paulina Rubio has appeared 4 times throughout her artistic career. In 2005 she was honored with the "Gaviota de Plata" at the request of the public. 

|-
| rowspan="1" align="center"|1994
| rowspan="3" align="center"| Paulina Rubio
| Premio Naranja
|
|-
| rowspan="1" align="center"|2000
| Medalla Especial
|
|-
| rowspan="1" align="center"|2005
| Gaviota de Plata
|

References

External links
 Official Website

Paulina Rubio
Paulina Rubio